The following lists events that happened during 1964 in Zanzibar.

Events

January
 January 12 - African nationalist rebels overthrow the predominantly Arab government of Zanzibar.

April
 April 26 - Tanganyika and Zanzibar merge to form Tanzania.

References

 
1960s in Zanzibar
Years of the 20th century in Zanzibar
Zanzibar
Zanzibar
Zanzibar